RocKabul is a documentary film that was produced between 2009 and 2016 in Afghanistan by Australian filmmaker Travis Beard. The film had its world premiere at the 2018 Rotterdam International Film Festival. It has been featured in over 40 film festivals, and had a limited cinema release within Australia in 2019. Bill Gould from the American alternative metal band Faith No More is an Executive Producer on the film and describes it as “A coming of age documentary which deals with youth identity and freedom of expression”

Critical Reception 
The film was generally very well-received critically.  it has an overall rating of 7.7/10 on review aggregator website IMDB.com. The Australian website The Curb described it as "A respectful, powerful, entertaining, informative, engaging documentary that kicks ass."

RocKabul has been featured in some of the biggest music magazines such as Rolling Stone, Metal Hammer, and Kerrang.

Funding 
The film was funded by the US State Dept under the Public Diplomacy Grant Initiative at the US Embassy in Kabul and Screen Australia.

Festivals 
RocKabul had its world premiere at the 2018 Rotterdam International Film Festival and its Australian premiere at Sydney Film Festival.

 Arizona Film Festival - US Premiere - Winner 'Best Music Documentary'
 Sharm El Sheik International Film Festival - Egypt
 Diorama Film Festival - India
 Heildelberg International Film Festival- Germany
 Rokumentti - Finland
 Braunschweig International Film Festival - Germany
 Doc n Roll - UK Premiere
 Verona Film Festival -Italy
 34th Warsaw Film Festival - Poland Premiere
 Slash Film Festival- Vienna - Austrian Premiere
 African Premiere - Festival Wave Rock Weekender Festival - Western Australia
 Off Cinema- Lago dei Cigni - Florence, Italy 
 Soundtrack Festival- Cologne - Germany Premiere
 Bucheon International Fantastic Film Festival - Asian PREMIERE
 Revelation International Film Festival -Perth Australia
 River film Festival, Padua, Italy
 NordicDocs, Trondheim, Norway
 Dokfest, Volda, Norway
 Reykjavik Deathfest, Iceland
 Cinemateket Film Festival, Trondheim, Norway
 Middle East Now Film Festival, Florence, Italy
 Titanic International Film Festival, Budapest, Hungary
 Inferno Extreme Metal Festival, Oslo, Norway
 Weesp Refugee Film Festival, Netherlands
 Kosmorama Festival- Trondheim, Norway

References

External links 
 
 

2018 films
Documentary films about heavy metal music and musicians
2010s English-language films